The time-dependent variational Monte Carlo (t-VMC) method is a quantum Monte Carlo approach to study the dynamics of closed, non-relativistic quantum systems in the context of the quantum many-body problem. It is an extension of the variational Monte Carlo method, in which a time-dependent pure quantum state is encoded by some variational wave function, generally parametrized as  
 

The time evolution of the parameters  can be found upon imposing a variational principle to the wave function. In particular one can show that the optimal parameters for the evolution satisfy at each time the equation of motion
 

where  is the Hamiltonian of the system,  are connected averages, and the quantum expectation values are taken over the time-dependent variational wave function, i.e., .

In analogy with the Variational Monte Carlo approach and following the Monte Carlo method for evaluating integrals, we can interpret 
as a probability distribution function over the multi-dimensional space spanned by the many-body configurations . The Metropolis–Hastings algorithm is then used to sample exactly from this probability distribution and, at each time , the quantities entering the equation of motion are evaluated as statistical averages over the sampled configurations. The trajectories  of the variational parameters are then found upon numerical integration of the associated differential equation.

References 

 

 

 

Quantum mechanics
Quantum Monte Carlo